Marco Antonio García Robledo (born 17 January 2000), also known as Enano, is a Mexican professional footballer who plays as a midfielder for Liga MX club UNAM.

Career statistics

Club

References

External links
 
 

2000 births
Living people
Footballers from the State of Mexico
Association football midfielders
Liga MX players
Liga Premier de México players
Club Universidad Nacional footballers
Liga de Expansión MX players
Mexican footballers